Distant Relatives is a collaborative studio album by American rapper Nas and Jamaican reggae vocalist Damian Marley. It was released on May 18, 2010, by Universal Republic and Def Jam Recordings. The album is Nas' tenth (third for Def Jam) and Marley's fourth studio album, respectively.

Distant Relatives was recorded between 2008 and 2010, being produced primarily by Damien and Stephen Marley, both sons of the most-known Jamaican musician Bob Marley. Fusing musical elements of hip hop and reggae, it features lyrical themes concerning ancestry, poverty, and the plight of Africa. It features appearances from K’naan, Stephen Marley, Dennis Brown, Junior Reid, Joss Stone and Lil Wayne.

The album debuted at number five on the US Billboard 200 chart, selling 57,000 copies in its first week. Upon its release, Distant Relatives received positive reviews from most music critics.

Background 
News of the album first came at the 2009 Grammy Awards, when Nas told MTV reporters "Right now, I'll tell you first, I'm working on an album with Damian Marley. We tryin' to build some schools in Africa with this one, and trying to build empowerment. We're tryin' to show love and stuff with this album. So, the record's … all about really the 'hood and Africa also as well." The album title derives from Nas and Marley's relationship, their shared African ancestry, and the shared ancestry of the entire human race; which musically and lyrically inspired each recording. Leftover tracks from Nas and Marley's previous albums were originally planned for an EP based on Africa. After working together, the duo decided to record a full album together.

Recording and production 
Nas and Marley began recording in 2008; recording sessions took place in Los Angeles, California, and Miami, Florida. Marley and his brother, Stephen, produced the majority of the album, using live instrumentation in the recording process. They collaborated with guest artists, including Stephen Marley, Joss Stone, Lil Wayne, and K'naan. On the album's production, Marley told Rolling Stone, "We're trying to have a sound that's reminiscent of both of us, but not exactly like either... A lot of charity albums come off corny. We want this to be something you'd play in your car."

Music 
Fusing hip hop and reggae musical elements, Marley and Nas also incorporated samples from African music into the album. The album's lyrical content heavily revolves around themes concerning Africa, from ancestry and poverty, with social commentary of the United States and Africa. The track "Count Your Blessings" reflects on the plight of Africa.

Release and promotion 

The album was released May 18, 2010 on Universal Republic and Def Jam Recordings. Its proceeds will go to a project in Africa, with the possibility of building a school in Congo.

Panel discussion 
At a sold-out panel discussion on the African diaspora and its relation to music, sponsored by National Geographic, Damian and Stephen Marley and Nas were among the several hip hop and reggae musicians voicing their solidarity. The discussion focused on the collaborations between artists of the two genres, and highlighted the Distant Relatives project.

Singles 
The first single, "As We Enter", was released on iTunes on February 23, 2010. It has so far peaked at #10 on the iTunes Hip Hop/Rap charts and #41 on the iTunes Music charts. The single debuted at number 39 on the UK Singles Chart. "Strong Will Continue" is featured as soundtrack in EA Sports game,  2010 FIFA World Cup South Africa. "My Generation" was released in the United Kingdom on August 30, 2010.

Critical reception 

Distant Relatives received generally positive reviews from music critics. At Metacritic, which assigns a normalized rating out of 100 to reviews from mainstream critics, the album received an average score of 73, based on 23 reviews, which indicates "generally favorable reviews". Allmusic's David Jeffries complimented its themes concerning Africa, calling it "one purposeful monster and a conceptional bull's eye that fully supports its title". Sputnikmusic's Ryan Flatley stated, "Nas and Damian Marley are a formidable pairing, seemingly on the same level throughout most of the album in thought and overall presence". Dave Simpson of The Guardian described its music as "thoughtful, sincere, weighty stuff, tackling subjects from African poverty to the diamond trade without sounding preachy or schmaltzy". Gervase de Wilde of The Daily Telegraph called it "predictably brilliant".

Although he found its musical fusion "a little overblown", David Amidon of PopMatters felt that "the alchemy between Nas and Junior Gong’s voice is obvious and engenders a strong sense of unity". Mojo commented that the album "finds a glorious similitude between the two disciplines." Slant Magazines M.T. Richards called the album "a bright, richly cultured work" and praised its themes of humanity and humility, writing that it "shines with passion and zeal, both in its content and production, which oozes earthy warmth". In MSN Music, Robert Christgau stated, "The result is an exceptionally melodic reggae album that's intensified by rapping devoid of dancehall patois and a hard edge unknown to roots revivalism. The result is also an exceptionally political hip-hop album that's most convincing when it doesn't multiply Afrocentric distortion by Rastafarian reasoning".

In a mixed review, J. Gabriel Boylan of Spin felt that its "revelatory message blunted by digressions". Sean Fennessey of The Village Voice found it to be "rudimentary" and "a tasteful affair full of uninteresting revelations and self-serious proclamations". Jeff Weiss of the Los Angeles Times commented that the album "vacillates between the dreary and dynamic", and criticized its "didacticism": "[L]eadened by reductive philosophies and crippling self-seriousness, the record often feels overly ponderous". Pitchfork Media's Tom Breihan viewed the lyrics as trite and stated, "Nas and Marley fall into a sort of middlebrow funk, kicking overripe platitudes over sunny session-musician lopes and letting their self-importance suffocate their personalities". Nathan Rabin of The A.V. Club called it "an Afrocentric manifesto sometimes loaded down by the weight of its noble ambitions".

Commercial performance
Distant Relatives debuted at number five on the US Billboard 200 chart with first-week sales of 57,000 copies. It serves as Nas's tenth top-ten album and Marley's second top-ten album in the United States. The album also entered at number four on Billboards Digital Albums, and at number one on its R&B/Hip-Hop Albums, Rap Albums, and Reggae Albums charts. As of June 2010, it has sold 134,000 copies in the United States.

Internationally, Distant Relatives attained some chart success. It entered at number 33 on the European Top 100 Albums chart. In the United Kingdom, it debuted at number 30 on the UK Albums Chart and at number four on the R&B Albums Chart. In Canada, the album entered at number 9 on the Top 100 Albums chart. In Germany, it debuted at number 38 on the Media Control Charts, and in the Netherlands, the album debuted at number 72 and peaked at number 65 on the Mega Album Top 100.

Track listing 
All tracks were produced by Damian Marley, except tracks 4, 9, and 11, which were produced by Stephen Marley.

 Sample credits

 "As We Enter" contains samples of "Yegelle Tezeta" by Mulatu Astatke.
 "Tribes at War" contains a sample from "Tribal War" by Earl Lowe.
 "Friends" contains a sample from "Undenge Uami" by David Zé.
 "Land Of Promise" contains a sample from  "Promised Land" by Dennis Brown.
 "Nah Mean" contains a sample from "Kurikute" by Sara Chaves.
 "Patience" contains a sample from "Sabali" by Amadou & Mariam from the album Welcome to Mali.
 "My Generation" contains a sample from "Generation" by Ziggy Marley.

Personnel 
Credits for Distant Relatives adapted from Allmusic.

 Luke Aiono – guitar
 Rahsaan Alexander – background vocals
 Chris Athens – mastering
 Kreiger Bailey – background vocals
 Amadou Bajayoko – composer
 Miguel Bermudez – assistant
 Chad Blaize – background vocals
 Dennis Brown – composer, background vocals
 Llamar "Riff Raff" Brown – keyboards
 Ann Marie Calhoun – violin
 Andrea Carter – guitar
 James "Bonzai" Caruso – mixing
 Jason Chantrelle – A&R
 Daniel Chappell – brass
 Squiddly Cole – percussion, drums, keyboards
 Shiah Coore – bass, drums, background vocals, handclapping
 Greg DePante – assistant
 Courtney Diedrick – drums, handclapping
 Sean Diedrick – keyboards
 Mariam Doumbia – composer
 Dwayne Carter – composer
 Nabil Elderkin – photography
 Paul Fakhourie – bass, keyboards
 Andre "Illestr8" Forrest – background vocals, handclapping
 Rovleta Fraser – background vocals
 Nesta Garrick – art direction, design
 Neville Garrick – photography, art consultant
 Marcus Garvey – quotation author
 Rannoy Gordon – guitar
 Andrew Green – engineer
 Tim Harkins – engineer
 Phillip "Winta" James – keyboards, background vocals, handclapping
 Sunday Agwaze Michaels – tumbadora "African conga"
 Nasir Jones – composer, writer, rapper, executive producer, producer, background vocals
 Keinan Warsame – composer

 L.A.'s Best Sunny Brae Choir – background vocals
 Marc Lee – engineer
 Funji Legohn – brass
 Casey Lewis – engineer
 Damian Marley – composer, producer, programming, background vocals, handclapping, executive producer
 Stephen Marley – guitar, composer, keyboards, programming, producer
 George Massa – engineer
 Christopher Merridith – bass, guitar, keyboards
 Jah Amen Mobley – background vocals
 Leon Mobley – percussion, background vocals
 Vernon Mungo – engineer
 Josh Newell – engineer
 Bobby Newland – assistant
 Steve Nowa – assistant
 Oakwood School 5th Grade Choir – background vocals
 Raymond Onyai – background vocals
 George Pajon – guitar
 Lisa Parade – director
 Josef Powell – background vocals
 José Quintero – assistant
 Benjamin Reid – engineer, assistant
 Mike Rowe – keyboards
 James Rudder – assistant
 Noelle Scaggs – background vocals
 Miles Tackett – cello
 Charles Wakeman – engineer, mixing, assistant
 Oren Waters – background vocals
 Will Wheaton – background vocals
 Roselyn Williams – background vocals
 Betty Wright – background vocals
 Eric "Twizted" Young – assistant
 Gabriel Zardes – A&R
 Danny Zook – sample clearance
 Corey Lloyd - sample clearance
 Michael Hardin - sample clearance

Charts

Weekly charts

Year-end charts

Certifications

References

External links 
 
 Distant Relatives at Discogs
 Distant Relatives at Metacritic
 
 Distant Relatives panel discussion at National Geographic

2010 albums
Damian Marley albums
Def Jam Recordings albums
Collaborative albums
Nas albums
Republic Records albums